The first season of the Fox American television psychological thriller horror series The Following premiered on January 21, 2013 and concluded on April 29, 2013, with a total of 15 episodes.

Plot 
The first season centers on former FBI agent Ryan Hardy (Kevin Bacon) and his attempts to recapture serial killer Joe Carroll (James Purefoy) following the latter's escape from prison. Hardy soon discovers that the charismatic Carroll has surrounded himself with a group of like-minded individuals (whom he met while teaching and while in prison), and turned them into a cult of fanatical killers. When Carroll's son Joey (Kyle Catlett) is abducted by his father's followers, the FBI discovers that it is the first step in a wider plan for Carroll to escape custody, humiliate Hardy, and be reunited with his ex-wife Claire (Natalie Zea).

Cast

Main cast
 Kevin Bacon as Ryan Hardy, a former FBI agent, recalled to assist the FBI once Carroll escapes and his cult begins to develop (15 episodes)
 James Purefoy  as Joe Carroll, a former professor turned serial killer and cult leader (15 episodes)
 Jeananne Goossen as Jennifer Mason, an FBI Agent who is soon replaced by Debra Parker (1 episode)
 Natalie Zea as Claire Matthews, Joe Carroll's ex-wife, who also had a relationship with Ryan Hardy (13 episodes)
 Annie Parisse as Debra Parker, head of the investigation on Carroll and his cult (14 episodes)
 Shawn Ashmore as Mike Weston, a young FBI agent (12 episodes)
 Valorie Curry as Emma Hill, a follower and romantic partner of Joe Carroll (15 episodes)
 Nico Tortorella as Jacob Wells, one of Carroll's followers and romantic interest of both Emma and Paul (12 episodes)
 Adan Canto as Paul Torres, one of Carroll's followers, working closely with Jacob and Emma (8 episodes)
 Kyle Catlett as Joey Matthews, Joe Carroll and Claire Matthews' son (12 episodes)
 Maggie Grace as Sarah Fuller, the last victim of Joe Carroll before he is captured (1 episode)

Recurring
 Chinasa Ogbuagu as Deirdre Mitchell, an FBI agent, specializing in following and tracking cult information on the computer (12 episodes)
 John Lafayette as Scott Turner, head of the Marshal's detail participating in the investigation of Carroll's cult (7 episodes)
 Warren Kole as Roderick, Carroll's friend and second in command of the cult (6 episodes)
 Jennifer Ferrin as Molly, one of Carroll's followers, planted to develop a romantic relationship with Ryan Hardy (5 episodes)
 Mike Colter as Nick Donovan, an FBI agent who assumes command of the FBI team following Carroll's second escape from prison (5 episodes)
 Li Jun Li as Megan Leeds, hostage of Paul, Jacob, and Emma (4 episodes)
 Tom Lipinski as Charlie Mead, an ex-militant and member of Carroll's cult assigned to stalk Claire Matthews in the years following Carroll's incarceration (4 episodes)
 Billy Brown as Agent Troy Riley, an FBI agent who initially assisted Hardy in the days following Carroll's escape from prison (3 episodes)
 Steve Monroe as Jordy Raines, a local cop and follower of Carroll (3 episodes)
 Michael Drayer as Rick Kester, follower of Carroll (3 episodes)
 Annika Boras as Louise Sinclair, follower of Carroll and love interest of Roderick (3 episodes)
 Renée Elise Goldsberry as Olivia Warren, Carroll's attorney (3 episodes)
 Christopher Denham as Vince McKinley, follower of Carroll (3 episodes)
 Virginia Kull as Maggie Kester, follower of Carroll (2 episodes)
 Arian Moayed as David, follower of Carroll (2 episodes)

Guest cast 
Audrey Esparza as Dana Montero in ("Let Me Go")

Episodes

Ratings

References

External links 
 
 

2013 American television seasons
The Following